Elliot Turiel (born 1938) is a United States born psychologist and Chancellor’s Professor at the Graduate School of Education at the University of California, Berkeley. He teaches courses on human development and its relation to education.

Education 
Turiel completed his PhD in Psychology from Yale University and was a student of Lawrence Kohlberg, who had a strong influence on his work.

Research 
Turiel conducts research in the development of social judgments and action, the development of moral reasoning, children’s conceptions of authority and rules in school settings, as well as culture and social development. He has also been a Guggenheim Fellow and a National Institute of Mental Health Fellow. His area of specialization includes cognitive development, Moral and ethical studies, and social and emotional development.

Books and publications 
Following are the books and other publications by Turiel. 
 The development of social knowledge: Morality and convention (1983) - citations
 The Development of Morality, published in Handbook of Child Psychology (1998)
 The Culture of Morality: Social Development, Context, and Conflict, from Cambridge University Press (2002)
 Social interactions and the development of social concepts in preschool children published in Child Development , 1978)
 Morality: Its structure, functions, and vagaries published in The Emergence of Morality in Young Children (with Melanie Killen and Charles Helwig, 1987)
 An experimental test of the sequentiality of developmental stages in the child's moral judgments published in (1966)

Notes

References 
 Elliot Turiel at UC Berkeley
 Social Domain Theory

American moral psychologists
University of California, Berkeley Graduate School of Education faculty
Yale Graduate School of Arts and Sciences alumni
Living people
1938 births